Balwant Singh (1945 – 14 November 2010), popularly known as Ballu, was an Indian volleyball player, considered a star of the India men's national volleyball team. His son Narender is a professional  volleyball player who plays for the Indian volleyball Team. Kaul village panchayat also organised Balwant Singh Memorial tournament after his death in the village.

Biography

Balwant Singh was born in 1945 in the Kaul village of Haryana state's Kaithal district.

Sporting career
Singh was a tall, ungainly youth. He was from a modest background and joined the Border Security Force (BSF) in Jalandhar, Punjab, which had a reputation for producing quality volleyball players at the time.

In the mid-1960s and into the 1970s, he was responsible for helping Punjab achieve national success, and he was awarded the country's top sporting honor, the Arjuna Award, in volleyball in 1972 for his excellent sportsmanship and contribution to the national team. Singh played for India in Asian Games of 1970, 1974, and 1978. He also played test matches for India in 1970, 1978 and 1980.

The first National Volleyball Championship in which Singh took part was that of 1965, and he continued to play in the Nationals till 1988. Between 1968 and 1981, Punjab won National Championships 10 times largely due to the performance of Singh. He participated in the All India Police Games from 1966 to 1990 representing Punjab Police and BSF.

Death and legacy
Singh ran a volleyball academy in Kaul, and a stadium was named after him. He died in November 2010.

References

Indian men's volleyball players
2010 deaths
Recipients of the Arjuna Award
Volleyball players from Haryana
People from Kaithal district
Volleyball players at the 1974 Asian Games
Volleyball players at the 1978 Asian Games
Asian Games competitors for India
1945 births